Catherine Dwyer  may refer to:

Catherine Winifred Dwyer, Australian educator and suffragist
Kathryn Dwyer Sullivan, American geologist